Chondrina avenacea is a species of small, air-breathing land snail, a terrestrial pulmonate gastropod mollusk in the family Chondrinidae.

Subspecies
 Chondrina avenacea avenacea (Bruguière, 1792)
 Chondrina avenacea istriana Ehrmann, 1931
 Chondrina avenacea latilabris (Stossich, 1895)
 Chondrina avenacea lepta (Westerlund, 1887)
 Chondrina avenacea lessinica (Adami, 1885)
 Chondrina avenacea veneta H. Nordsieck, 1962

Distribution 
This species occurs in:
 Western Europe
 Bulgaria

 Czech Republic - in Bohemia, endangered (EN)

References

External links
 

Chondrinidae
Gastropods described in 1792